The  (JFCR) is a non-profit cancer research organization based in Ariake, Tokyo. The JFCR was founded in 1908 as the first Japanese organization specializing in cancer by Katsusaburō Yamagiwa and his supporters. The Cancer Institute and its attached hospital of JFCR were set up in 1934. The JFCR became a full member of the Union for International Cancer Control in 1968.

Research
The Cancer Institute of JFCR is one of the leading medical and biological research institutes in Japan. When the American journal Science published a special feature on science in Japan in 1992, the institute was described as one of the most productive and most cited institutions in the world at the time.

The research at the Institute covers a wide variety of biomedical fields, including biochemistry, cell biology, pathology, carcinogenesis, genomics, system biology, and biomedical engineering. Achievements include the following.
1979: Tadatsugu Taniguchi isolated interferon gene.
1983: Mitsuaki Yoshida identified the molecular structure of human T-lymphotropic virus 1 responsible for adult T-cell leukemia/lymphoma.
1992: Yusuke Nakamura isolated the tumor suppressor gene APC responsible for familial adenomatous polyposis.

Hospital

The Cancer Institute Hospital of JFCR was established in 1934 as Japan's only specialized cancer hospital, with just 29 beds, and the first director was Ryukichi Inada. The Hospital now has approximately 700 beds, and in fiscal 2011 it treated 61,324 outpatients and 9,690 inpatients.

Clinics and departments include Thoracic Center (Thoracic Medical Oncology and Surgical Oncology), Gastroenterology Center (Gastroenterological Internal Medicine and Surgery), Breast Oncology Center (Breast Medical Oncology and Surgical Oncology), Gynecological Oncology, Head and Neck Oncology, Orthopedic Oncology, Genitourinary Oncology, Hematology Oncology, Medical Oncology, Sarcoma Center, Palliative Therapy, General Medicine, Anesthesiology/Pain Service, Psycho-Oncology, Plastic and Reconstructive Surgery, Ophthalmology, Infectious Disease, Chinese Herbal Medicine, Dentistry, Radiation Oncology, Diagnostic Radiology, Endoscopy, Comprehensive Medical Oncology, Clinical Genetic Oncology, and Cancer Screening Center.

Notable scientists and other people from JFCR
Mataro Nagayo, pathologist
Takaoki Sasaki, oncologist
Masaru Kuru, surgeon
Tomizo Yoshida, discoverer of Yoshida Sarcoma
Takashi Sugimura, biochemist
Masahito, Prince Hitachi, cancer researcher and honorary president
Kikuko, Princess Takamatsu, sponsor for JFCR

See also
Japanese Cancer Association
Cancer Science

References

External links

1908 establishments in Japan
Biomedical research foundations
Foundations based in Japan
Cancer organizations based in Japan
Organizations established in 1908
Medical research institutes in Japan
Buildings and structures in Koto, Tokyo